Peter Tevis (born 10 February 1937, in Santa Barbara, California, USA, died 13 September 2006 in Mercer Island, Washington) was an American folk singer best remembered for his work on the soundtracks of composer Ennio Morricone.

Tevis met Morricone while living in Italy in the 1960s, and suggested working together. A 1962 recording of the song "Pastures of Plenty" by Woody Guthrie became a small hit single (RCA PM45-3115). Morricone later reworked it into the title theme of the famous Spaghetti Western movie "A Fistful of Dollars" directed by Sergio Leone and starring Clint Eastwood (without Tevis lyrics). Later they continued to collaborate on a number of recordings. Tevis is credited with singing the lyrics of songs on the soundtracks of several Spaghetti Western movies, including:

"A Gringo Like Me" from the film Gunfight at Red Sands
"Lonesome Billy" from the film Bullets Don't Argue
"Per un Pugno di Dollari" (A Fistful of Dollars)

Tevis was also credited with singing the theme song of the animated television series Underdog (TV series) in the 1960s.

In the 1970s, Tevis ran a record label called Pet Records, based in Burbank, California. The label released records designed to train pet birds to talk as well as other pet training records. The word pet also stood for "Peter Edward Tevis."

Tevis was married to actress Tiffany Bolling from 1969 to 1970.

In his latter years he suffered from Parkinson's disease and nearly lost his voice.

Filmography

References

External links

Blog post
PET Records bird training recordings
 
  (same person?)
 

1937 births
2006 deaths
American folk singers
20th-century American singers